Mégarine is a district in Touggourt Province, Algeria. It was named after its capital, Mégarine. As of the 2008 census, the district had a total population of 21,823.

Municipalities
The district is further divided into 2 communes:
Mégarine
Sidi Slimane

References

Districts of Ouargla Province